Lucky: No Time For Love is a 2005 Indian Hindi-language romance film depicting the story of two lovers in war-torn Russia written and directed by Radhika Rao and Vinay Sapru. The film stars Mithun Chakraborty, Salman Khan and Sneha Ullal.

Plot
Lucky Negi is the daughter of Mr. Negi who works for Mr. Sekhri, the Indian Ambassador to Russia who has a son named Aditya. Lucky is a quiet, yet studious girl and lives with her parents as well as younger sister.

One day, while going to school, Lucky's bicycle tire goes flat and she ends up being the victim of an attempted rape by a young Russian. She manages to escape and hides in a parked car while the rapist is chased away by the car's owner, Aditya. Unaware of his "cargo", Aditya drives the car to meet his father until he is stopped at a check-post. That's when he discovers Lucky sitting in the back seat. During the checking, a terrorist attack occurs and utter chaos ensues. Aditya and Lucky manage to escape and hide in an isolated graveyard. Meanwhile, Sekhri and Negi recruit a private investigator, retired Colonel Pindi Das Kapoor, to locate their children. Just as Colonel Kapoor finds the graveyard, Aditya is forced to leave with Lucky when she accidentally drinks water poisoned by the terrorists. Aditya then manages to persuade a local doctor to take him and Lucky in, where she receives treatment. When the two eventually leave the doctor under pressing circumstances, a series of events ensues as they struggle to return to their families. Aditya and Lucky soon fall in love and are finally found by the Colonel, upon which they reunite with their families and get ready to fly back to India. Upon reaching the airport, the Colonel promises to return Aditya's car to him by ship, while Aditya and Lucky bid farewell to Russia and the Colonel.

Cast
Mithun Chakraborty as Retd. Colonel Pindi Das Kapoor
Salman Khan as Aditya "Adi" Sekhri
Sneha Ullal as Lucky Negi
Kader Khan as Doctor
Navni Parihar as Anjali Negi
Ravi Baswani as Mr. Vishal Negi
Vikram Gokhale as Ambassador Sekhri
Meher Vij as Padma (Lucky's school friend)
Mumaith Khan as Sunaina ( Lucky's school friend)
Rebecca as Naina
Greg Roman as Zahir

Soundtrack
According to the Indian trade website Box Office India, with around 18,00,000 units sold, this film's soundtrack album was the year's fifth highest-selling.

 Music Label: T-Series
 Music Director: Adnan Sami
 Lyricist: Sameer
 Singers : Lata Mangeshkar, Asha Bhosle, Anuradha Paudwal, Alka Yagnik, Udit Narayan, Sonu Nigam & Adnan Sami

List of songs and singers:

Release
The film topped the Chennai box office on its opening weekend.

References

External links
 
 India Today review

T-Series (company) films
2005 films
2000s Hindi-language films
Indian romantic drama films
Films shot in Russia
2005 romantic drama films